Hanifa Safi (died 13 July 2012) was the regional head of the Women's Affairs Ministry for Laghman Province, Afghanistan,  since 2008. She worked on cases concerning violence against women, supporting the women to overcome the violence. On July 13, Hanifa Safi was killed by a bomb attached to her car, also wounding her husband and her daughter, while driving through Laghman's capital Mehtar Lam. Mehtar Lam lies roughly 150 km (93 miles) north-east of Kabul. The assassination was widely condemned including by the United Nations. In 2006, in a similar case, the regional head for Women's Affairs in Kandahar Province was gunned down by the Taliban.

See also 
 Malalai Kakar

References 

2012 deaths
Afghan politicians
Pashtun women
Year of birth missing